This is a list of NASA missions, both crewed and robotic, since the establishment of NASA in 1958. There are over 80 currently active science missions.

X-Plane program

Since 1945, NACA (NASA's predecessor) and, since 1958, NASA have conducted the X-Plane Program.  The program was originally intended to create a family of experimental aircraft not intended for production beyond the limited number of each design built solely for flight research. The first X-Plane, the Bell X-1, was the first rocket-powered airplane to break the sound barrier on October 14, 1947. X-Planes have set numerous milestones since then, both crewed and unpiloted.

Human spaceflight

NASA has successfully launched 166 crewed flights. Three have ended in failure, causing the deaths of seventeen crewmembers in total: Apollo 1 (which never launched) killed three crew members in 1967, STS-51-L (the Challenger disaster) killed seven in 1986, and STS-107 (the Columbia disaster) killed seven more in 2003. Thus far, 163 missions were conducted without fatalities.

Notes:

Canceled

In May 2009, the Obama Administration announced the launch of an independent review of planned U.S. human space flight activities with the goal of ensuring that the nation is on a vigorous and sustainable path to achieving its boldest aspirations in space. The review was conducted by a panel of experts led by Norman Augustine, the former CEO of Lockheed Martin, who served on the President's Council of Advisers on Science and Technology under both Democrat and Republican presidents.

The "Review of United States Human Space Flight Plans" was to examine ongoing and planned National Aeronautics and Space Administration (NASA) development activities, as well as potential alternatives and present options for advancing a safe, innovative, affordable, and sustainable human space flight program in the years following Space Shuttle retirement. The panel worked closely with NASA and sought input from the United States Congress, the White House, the public, industry, and international partners as it developed its options. It presented its results on October 22, 2009.

In February 2010, Obama announced his proposal to cancel the Constellation Program as part of the 2011 Economic Projects. Constellation was officially cancelled by the NASA Budget Authorization Act on October 11, 2010 .

Future

NASA brought the Orion spacecraft back to life from the defunct Constellation Program and successfully test launched the first capsule on December 5, 2014 aboard EFT-1. NASA plans to use the Orion crew vehicle to send humans to deep space locations such as the Moon and Mars starting in the 2020s. Orion will be powered by NASA's new heavy lift vehicle, the Space Launch System (SLS), which is currently under development.

Artemis 1 is the first flight of the SLS and was launched as a test of the completed Orion and SLS system. During the mission, an uncrewed Orion capsule will spend 10 days in a distant retrograde  orbit around the Moon before returning to Earth.

After Artemis 2, the Power and Propulsion Element of the Lunar Gateway and three components of an expendable lunar lander are planned to be delivered on multiple launches from commercial launch service providers.

Artemis 3 is planned to launch in 2024 aboard a SLS Block 1 rocket and will use the minimalist Gateway and expendable lander to achieve the first crewed lunar landing of the program. The flight is planned to touch down on the lunar south pole region, with two astronauts staying there for about one week.

Robotic missions

Suborbital
 Anomalous Transport Rocket Experiment (ATREX) – five consecutive launches, 80 seconds apart on March 27, 2012, studied the high-altitude jet stream.
 NASA Sounding Rocket Program
 SHIELDS – launched April 19, 2021, collected data from the heliopause.

Earth and Heliocentric satellites

 Biosatellite 1, 2 and 3
 Cosmic Background Explorer (COBE)
- Earth Observing System
 Gravity Recovery and Climate Experiment (GRACE)
 NPOESS Preparatory Project (NPP) – National Polar-orbiting Operational Environmental Satellite System (NPOESS)
 Upper Atmosphere Research Satellite (UARS)
 Echo 1 and 2
- Great Observatories
 Chandra X-ray Observatory
 Compton Gamma Ray Observatory
 Hubble Space Telescope – ESA partnership
 Spitzer Space Telescope (formerly known as the Space Infrared Telescope Facility, SIRTF)
 James Webb Space Telescope (JWST) – ESA partnership –launched in 2021
- High Energy Astronomy Observatory program
 High Energy Astronomy Observatory 1 (HEAO 1)
 Einstein Observatory (HEAO 2) first fully imaging X-ray telescope
 High Energy Astronomy Observatory 3 (HEAO 3)
 Imager for Magnetopause-to-Aurora Global Exploration (IMAGE)
 Infrared Astronomical Satellite (IRAS)
 Jason-1
 OSTM/Jason-2
 Jason-3
 Landsat program
Landsat 1
Landsat 2
Landsat 3
Landsat 4
Landsat 5
Landsat 6
Landsat 7
Landsat 8
Landsat 9
- Living With a Star
Van Allen Probes – Twin probes studying the Van Allen radiation belt
 Moderate-Resolution Imaging Spectroradiometer (MODIS)
 Multi-angle Imaging SpectroRadiometer (MISR)
- New Millennium Program (NMP)
 Earth Observing-1 (EO-1)
 Space Technology 5 (ST5)
 Space Technology 6 (ST6)
 NanoSail-D and NanoSail-D2
 Orbiting Carbon Observatory (OCO)
- Origins program
 Far Ultraviolet Spectroscopic Explorer (FUSE)
 Kepler  searching for Earth-sized exoplanets in the habitable zone
 Time History of Events and Macroscale Interactions during Substorms (THEMIS)
- Small Explorer program (SMEX)
 Aeronomy of Ice in the Mesosphere (AIM)
 Fast Auroral Snapshot Explorer (FAST)
 Galaxy Evolution Explorer (GALEX)
 Interstellar Boundary Explorer (IBEX)
 Nuclear Spectroscopic Telescope Array (NuSTAR) – X-ray telescope orbiting Earth
 Reuven Ramaty High Energy Solar Spectroscopic Imager (RHESSI) – Sun observing, Earth satellite
 Solar Anomalous and Magnetospheric Particle Explorer (SAMPEX)
 Submillimeter Wave Astronomy Satellite (SWAS)
 Transition Region and Coronal Explorer (TRACE) – Sun observing, Earth satellite
 Wide Field Infrared Explorer (WIRE)
- Solar Terrestrial Probes program
 Hinode (Solar-B)
 Thermosphere Ionosphere Mesosphere Energetics and Dynamics (TIMED)
 Two Wide-angle Imaging Neutral-atom Spectrometers (TWINS)
 Uhuru
 Wilkinson Microwave Anisotropy Probe (WMAP)
Imaging X-ray Polarimetry Explorer (IXPE)
BioSentinel

Lunar

 Clementine
 Gravity Recovery and Interior Laboratory (GRAIL) 
-Lunar Orbiter program
 Lunar Orbiter 1
 Lunar Orbiter 2
 Lunar Orbiter 3
 Lunar Orbiter 4
 Lunar Orbiter 5
- Lunar Precursor Robotic Program (LPRP)
 Lunar Crater Observation and Sensing Satellite (LCROSS)
 Lunar Reconnaissance Orbiter (LRO)
 Lunar Prospector
 Moon Mineralogy Mapper (M3) – instrument for ISRO's Chandraayan-1
-Pioneer program
 Pioneer 0
 Pioneer 1
 Pioneer 2
 Pioneer P-1
 Pioneer P-3
 Pioneer P-30
 Pioneer P-31
 Pioneer 3
 Pioneer 4
- Ranger program
 Ranger 1
 Ranger 2
 Ranger 3
 Ranger 4
 Ranger 5
 Ranger 6
 Ranger 7
 Ranger 8
 Ranger 9
- Surveyor program
 Surveyor 1
 Surveyor 2
 Surveyor 3
 Surveyor 4
 Surveyor 5
 Surveyor 6
 Surveyor 7
 CAPSTONE
 Korea Pathfinder Lunar Orbiter's ShadowCam instrument
 LunaH-Map
 Lunar IceCube
 Lunar Flashlight

Martian

- Mariner program
 Mariner 4
 Mariner 6 and 7
 Mariner 8
 Mariner 9
- Mars Exploration Rovers
 Spirit rover
 Opportunity rover
 Mars Global Surveyor
 Mars Odyssey
- Mars Pathfinder
 Sojourner rover
- Mars Polar Lander
 Deep Space 2 (DS2) – (sub-surface probes)
 Mars Reconnaissance Orbiter
- Mars Science Laboratory (MSL)
 Curiosity rover
- Mars 2020
 Perseverance rover
 Ingenuity helicopter
- Mars Scout program
 Mars Atmosphere and Volatile EvolutioN (MAVEN)
 Phoenix
- Viking program
 Viking 1
 Viking 2

Asteroidal/cometary
- Discovery Program
Deep Impact (primary) – EPOXI (extended)
Stardust – follow-up for Deep Impact's primary mission to 9P/Tempel
 Lucy – launched October 16, 2021.  Will fly by one main-belt asteroid and seven Jupiter Trojan asteroids.
- New Millennium Program (NMP)
Deep Space 1 (DS1) – first spacecraft propelled by an Ion thruster
Near Earth Asteroid Rendezvous – Shoemaker (NEAR Shoemaker) – close study of 433 Eros
- New Frontiers program
 Origins Spectral Interpretation Resource Identification Security Regolith Explorer (OSIRIS-REx) – launched September 2016
 Double Asteroid Redirection Test (DART)
Near-Earth Asteroid Scout

Other planets
 Cassini–Huygens – Saturn and its moons
 Dawn – Vesta in 2011-2012, and Ceres in 2015-2018
 Galileo – Jupiter and its moons
 Juno – Jupiter
 Magellan (Venus Radar Mapper)
- Mariner program – Venus
 Mariner 1
 Mariner 2
 Mariner 5
 Mariner 10 – first to Mercury
 MESSENGER – first to orbit Mercury
- New Frontiers program
 Juno Spacecraft Mission – Jupiter-bound for polar orbit in 2016
 New Horizons – Pluto and its moons in 2015
- Pioneer program
 Pioneer 5 – interplanetary space between Earth and Venus
 Pioneer 6, 7, 8, and 9 – Solar wind, solar magnetic field and cosmic rays
 Pioneer 10 – first to the asteroid belt and Jupiter
 Pioneer 11 – asteroid belt and Jupiter, first to Saturn
 Pioneer Venus project
- Voyager program
 Voyager 1 – Jupiter, Saturn
 Voyager 2 – Jupiter, Saturn, first to Uranus and Neptune

Solar
 Genesis – returned sample of solar wind

- Living With a Star
 Balloon Array for RBSP Relativistic Electron Losses (BARREL) –  two campaigns of 20 balloons each, studying the Van Allen radiation belts, 2012 to 2014 This mission is  complement to the Van Allen Probes (RBSP).
 Solar Dynamics Observatory (SDO)

 Solar and Heliospheric Observatory (SOHO) – ESA partnership
 Solar Maximum Mission (SolarMax)

- Solar Terrestrial Probes program
 Magnetospheric Multiscale Mission (MMS) – launch readiness date was October 2014, launched on March 13, 2015 at 02:44 UTC.
 Solar TErrestrial RElations Observatory (STEREO)

 Ulysses spacecraft – ESA partnership
 Parker Solar Probe – the first mission into the Sun's corona, successfully launched on August 12, 2018.
CubeSat for Solar Particles (CuSP)

Planned missions
- Origins Program
 Europa Clipper; launch ~2024
- New Frontiers program
 Dragonfly (spacecraft); launch ~2026
- Discovery Program
 Psyche; launch ~2023
 VERITAS; launch ~2028
 DAVINCI+; launch ~2029-2030

Canceled or undeveloped missions

Comet Rendezvous Asteroid Flyby (CRAF)
Jupiter Icy Moons Orbiter (JIMO)
Mars Astrobiology Explorer-Cacher (MAX-C) 
Mars Telecommunications Orbiter (MTO)
Asteroid Redirect Mission (2013-2017)
- Origins program
 Space Interferometry Mission (SIM)
 Terrestrial Planet Finder (TPF)
Pluto Kuiper Express (PLUTOKE) – replaced by New Horizons

Old proposals
- Mars Scout program
 Aerial Regional-scale Environmental Survey (ARES) (2000-2010 concept)
 TAU (spacecraft)- probe to 1000 AU (1980s concept)

See also
 NASA:
 Large strategic science missions, the NASA flagship missions
 Discovery Program, medium cost NASA missions
 New Frontiers program, medium-large NASA missions to outer planets
 When We Left Earth: The NASA Missions – 2008 documentary covering NASA's mission history.
 Space exploration
 Timeline of Solar System exploration
 List of European Space Agency programmes and missions

References

Bibliography

External links
 NASA - Missions

Lists of space missions
Missions